William Lister Lister (27 December 1859 – 6 November 1943) was an Australian painter who specialized in landscapes. He was awarded the Wynne Prize seven times. He was also a recipient of the Commonwealth Government prize for his painting of the Federal Capital site at Canberra. In some sources, the two Listers are hyphenated.

Biography
At the age of eight he moved with his parents to Yorkshire, England; where his father was born. There, he studied at Bedford School, then spent a year in Paris studying art. While there, his father changed the family name from Buttrey to Lister by deed poll. From 1876 to 1880, he studied mechanical engineering at the College of Science and Arts and the Fairfield Engineering Works, both in Glasgow, after which he became a ship's engineer. While studying, he joined the St. Mungo Art Club, founded by a Scottish cartoonist known as  Cynicus, and was soon exhibiting at the Royal Scottish Academy, aged only seventeen.

After serving four years at sea as a ship's engineer, he settled in London in 1884, where he began painting professionally as well as teaching. During his stay there, he exhibited at the Royal Society of British Artists, the Royal Institute of Oil Painters and several others. He returned to Sydney in 1888 where he began producing the seascapes and coastal scenes for which he is best known. He joined the Royal Art Society of New South Wales, and remained with that organization when several artists broke away to form the "Society of Artists, Sydney" in 1907. During this time, he also became a trustee of the National Art Gallery of New South Wales and served as vice-president from 1919 until his death.

In 1898 he had a successful showing at the Exhibition of Australian Art in the Grafton Galleries, London. That same year, he received his first Wynne Prize. In 1899, he married Bessie Enid Jenkins, a divorcée. He was a regular exhibitor at Anthony Hordern's art gallery from 1919 to 1940. Margaret Preston cited him as an early influence. He was known for his preference for very large canvases.

He was struck by a taxi in Mosman; suffering severe head injuries from which he died a few hours later. In his obituary in the Sydney Morning Herald they made note of the fact that the driver was a woman. He was survived by a daughter. His wife had predeceased him in 1935.

Selected paintings

Wynne Prize awards

1898 - The Last Gleam
1906 - The Golden Splendour of the Bush
1910 - Mid Song of Birds and Insects Murmuring
1912 - Sydney Harbour
1913 - Federal Capital Site
1917 - Windswept Marshes
1925 - Track through the Bush

References

 McCulloch, Alan. Encyclopedia of Australian Art, Hutchinson Ltd London 1968. Page 332
 McCulloch, Alan and Susan. Encyclopedia of Australian Art. 3rd Edition, Allen & Unwin, Sydney, 1994. Page 432
 Campbell, Jean. Australian Watercolour Painters: 1780 to the Present Day. Craftsman House, Sydney, 1989. Page 336
 Clifford-Smith, Silas. 'William Lister Lister', Dictionary of Australian Artists Online (peer reviewed biography), accessed 2010-01-02

External links

More works by Lister @ ArtNet
 Link to the watercolour, 'The Federal Capital site, Canberra, Australia, 1913', at National Library of Australia
 Link to the oil on canvas, 'Canberra, 1912', at National Library of Australia

1859 births
1943 deaths
Australian watercolourists
Alumni of the University of Strathclyde
Artists from Sydney
Australian people of English descent
Wynne Prize winners
People from Manly, New South Wales
Pedestrian road incident deaths
Road incident deaths in New South Wales
19th-century Australian painters
20th-century Australian painters